Kulmbach station is a railway station in the municipality of Kulmbach, located in the district of Kulmbach in Middle Franconia, Germany.

References

External links

Railway stations in Bavaria
Buildings and structures in Kulmbach (district)